The  was an army of the Imperial Japanese Army during the final days of World War II.

History
The Japanese 27th Army was formed on March 16, 1944, as part of the last desperate defense effort by the Empire of Japan to deter possible landings of Allied forces in the northern Chishima Islands territories from northeastern Hokkaidō to Kamchatka during Operation Downfall.  It was headquartered on Etorofu.

The Japanese 27th Army consisted mostly of poorly trained reservists, conscripted students and home guard militia. It was disbanded on  February 1, 1945, and its units were incorporated directly into the Japanese 5th Area Army

List of Commanders

See also
 Organization of Kita and Minami Fortresses

References

External links

27
Military units and formations established in 1944
Military units and formations disestablished in 1945